Xuefei Yang (born March 15, 1977) is a Chinese classical guitarist.

Early years
Yang was born in Beijing in 1977, and began playing the guitar when she was seven.  Three years later, she started studying under Chen Zhi, the Chairman of the China Classical Guitar Society. She made a public debut at the First China International Guitar Festival. At her debut, Masaru Kohno presented her a guitar, Pepe by Aria; it was her first foreign-made guitar.  She won second prize at the Beijing Senior Guitar competition when she was eleven.

In her youth, Yang played extensively in China, Hong Kong, Macau, Spain, and Australia, and giving concert tours in Taiwan, Japan and Portugal. At twelve, she played in Tokyo for the first time, and was given a special award by the Guitar Alliance of Japan. Masaru Kohno took Yang to his studio and asked her to take any guitar with her. She played the Kohno guitar, made of cedar and jacaranda, regularly over the next five years. During her Madrid debut at age 14, the composer Joaquín Rodrigo was in the audience; in 1995, after John Williams listened to her performance in Beijing, he was so impressed that he loaned two of his own Greg Smallman guitars to her conservatory, for her and other top students to play.

Further education
After completing her secondary schooling, Yang completed her studies in Beijing, becoming the first guitarist to enter a music school in China, and obtaining a Bachelor of Arts from the Central Conservatory of Music. She was the first guitarist from China to study in the United Kingdom and the first guitarist to receive an international scholarship from the Associated Board of the Royal Schools of Music for her postgraduate programme at the Royal Academy of Music in London.

She moved to London in 2000, studying under Michael Lewin, John Mills and Timothy Walker and performing at many solo recitals and concert performances in the UK and Europe. She graduated with distinction in 2002, achieving a Recital Diploma and receiving the Royal Academy of Music Principal's prize for exceptional all-round studentship.

Awards
Yang has won numerous prizes in music competitions including the Stotsenberg International Classical Guitar Competition, the San Francisco International Guitar Competition and the Young Concert Artist International competition in the United States, and the Darwin International Guitar Competition in Australia. She was awarded first prize in the Ivor Mairants Guitar Award by the City of London's Worshipful Company of Musicians, and won the Dorothy Grinstead Prize for a recital at Fairfield Hall, Croydon.

Performances
Yang has performed in the United Kingdom, the U.S., Germany, France, Spain, Belgium, the Netherlands, Finland, Australia, China, Japan and Singapore. Concert appearances have included playing Rodrigo's Fantasía para un gentilhombre with the BBC Concert Orchestra and Concierto de Aranjuez with the Royal Academy of Music Symphony Orchestra at Duke's Hall. She has featured on radio as part of the BBC Proms London Composer Portrait series, and performed at 54 concerts for the "Night of the Proms Tour" in 2003/2004. In January 2011 she appeared in Ireland for the first time, at the National Concert Hall in Dublin.

Recordings
Si Ji (Four Seasons) contains a number of compositions by Chinese composers, some of which imitate the sounds of traditional Chinese musical instruments.  Romance de Amor comprises primarily Spanish repertoire.

Reception
 "It was great to hear you play! I wish you every success in future and hope you will have the opportunity you very much deserve to play in many countries." (John Williams, 1995)
 "The enthusiastic reviews that have appeared in the press about this far-eastern prodigy do not seem in the slightest exaggerated after hearing this concert. Xuefei Yang is already among the best guitarists in the world." (Badische Zeitung, 9 July 2002)
 "…she left the audience completely enraptured." (Oberbadisches Volksblatt, 9 July 2002)
 "But the star of the evening was the Chinese guitarist Xuefei Yang. In Xiaoyong Chen’s Static and Rotation she turned sweet, chiming overtones into a wild sound like a hailstorm on a window. And, playing with similar brilliance in Robert Saxton’s Night Dance, Timothy Salter’s Equipoise premiere and Britten's Nocturnal after John Dowland, Yang’s easeful virtuosity won the day." (Matthew Connolly, The Times, January 14, 2003)

Discography
Classical Guitar by Xuefei Yang, 1999 (先恒, Xianheng Nanjing)
Si Ji (Four Seasons), 2005 (GSP)
Romance de Amor, 2006 (EMI)
40 Degrees North, 2008 (EMI)
Concierto de Aranjuez, 2010 (EMI), with Barcelona Symphony Orchestra and National Orchestra of Catalonia
J.S.Bach: Concertos & Transcriptions, 2012 (EMI), with Elias String Quartet
Britten Songs, 2013 (EMI), with Ian Bostridge
Sojourn - The Very Best of Xuefei Yang, 2013 (Warner), with Elias String Quartet
Heartstrings, 2015 (Decca/Universal)
Colours of Brazil, 2016 (Decca/Universal)
Songs from Our Ancestors, 2016 (Globe Music), with Ian Bostridge
Milonga Del Angel, 2018 (Deutsche Grammophon), with Mengla Huang
One Day in November (EP), 2019 (Apple Music)
Sketches of China, 2020 (Decca/Universal), with Xiamen Philharmonic Orchestra, Weiliang Zhang, Sha Yuan
Summertime (EP), 2021 (Apple Music)
Winter Songs (EP), 2021 (Apple Music)
Magna Carta: The Complete Works for Guitar and Orchestra of John Brunning, 2022 (Prima Facie), with Royal Liverpool Philharmonic
Guitar Favourites, 2022 (Decca/Universal)
Striking a Chord, 2022 (Warner)

References

External links
www.xuefeiyang.com

Interviews
Xuefei Yang Interview Feb 21, 2007 (Classical Guitar Alive!) mp3
Interviews (www.xuefeiyang.com)

Audio and video
Audio/video page from Xuefei Yang official site

People's Republic of China musicians
Chinese classical guitarists
Child classical musicians
Alumni of the Royal Academy of Music
Musicians from Beijing
1977 births
EMI Classics and Virgin Classics artists
Living people
Women classical guitarists
21st-century guitarists
21st-century women guitarists